The Australian Monarchist League is an incorporated nonprofit organisation, headquartered in Sydney, Australia, promoting and educating on the Australian Constitution and monarchy. The organisation was part of the "no" campaign in the 1999 republic referendum, which asked whether Australia should become a republic and whether Australia should alter the constitution to insert a preamble. Neither of the amendments passed.

Structure

The Australian Monarchist League is a nonprofit organisation incorporated in New South Wales. Originally a branch of the London-based International Monarchist League (IML) the league severed any affiliation with the IML and established itself as an independent Australian body. (A separate organisation, the International Monarchist League in Australia, was formed in 2006 as an affiliate of the IML). The organisation is not formally associated with any political party or other organisation, and it has no paid staff, relying on volunteers to keep the group functioning. The league is governed by a National Council comprising representatives from branches in each state and territory. All positions in the league are subject to election in accordance with the league's constitution. The elected chairman and CEO of the league is Philip Benwell who has served on a volunteer basis for over 25 years.

Activities

1999 republic referendum 

Positions on the official Vote No Committee were filled according to votes received at the Convention election where the league had won 6.05% of the vote. Accordingly, all eight monarchist seats went to an alternative organization which had won 72.39% of the monarchist vote, Australians for Constitutional Monarchy (along with two supporting an elected head of state). Nevertheless, the Australian Monarchist League played a role in the proceedings, including Benwell privately taking the Australian Electoral Commission to the Federal Court in an unsuccessful attempt to gain a firmer definition of what would count as a "yes" vote in the referendum, arguing that the planned approach (accepting any vote in which the voter's intention was clear) was such that the counting would be weighted towards "yes" and "opened the door for electoral fraud".

Recent activities 

Both prior and subsequent to the referendum, the Australian Monarchist League has acted to protect the image of the constitutional monarchy. Some examples of successes in this area include complaints lodged by the organisation in 2005 regarding an image depicting Princess Diana by photographer Erwin Olaf at the Australian Centre for Photography. Similarly, they wrote to the Japanese ambassador in 1998 after Toyota ran an advertisement showing a Range Rover with the words "Don't worry, Your Majesty, you're not the only British export that's had its day", resulting in Toyota withdrawing the advertisement and in 2008 complained to both the Coopers Brewery and the Advertising Standards Bureau after Coopers ran an advertisement stating "Forget the monarchy, support the publicans", forcing its withdrawal. The league continues to maintain vigilance, more recently lodging complaints against the ABC, claiming bias.

Along with their actions during the referendum, the league have been active in protecting the symbols of Australia's constitutional monarchy; they acted to ensure that the pledge of loyalty to the monarch remained a part of Scouts Australia, and spoke against the removal of references to the Queen from the Victorian legal system. Aside from campaigning, the AML distributed copies of William Dargie's portrait of Queen Elizabeth II after the Commonwealth Government Bookshops ceased selling photographs of the monarch.

Other activities include disseminating literature and maintaining a library on Australian history and the Australian Constitution and conducting public seminars.

The league condemned Prime Minister Anthony Albanese in June 2022 for the appointment of Matt Thistlethwaite as Assistant Minister for the Republic.

Membership

The league has approximately 11,000 financial members and a support base of over 53,000.

See also

Constitutional history of Australia
Constitutional monarchy
Australians for Constitutional Monarchy

References

External links

Organisations based in Sydney
Monarchist organizations
Political advocacy groups in Australia
1993 establishments in Australia
Organizations established in 1993
Monarchism in Australia